Varman or its variants, Varma, Verma, Varman, Burman or Barman, are surnames that are used in India and southeast Asia.

Etymology 
According to Radhakanta Deb, the surname is derived from the Sanskrit word for "Shield, Defensive armour".

According to S. Ramachandran for the Tamil version the name is a corrupt version of the Tamil word .

It goes as following  Perumagan (பெருமகன்) -> Perumaan (பெருமான்) -> Peruman (பெருமன்) -> Paruman (பருமன்) -> Varuman (வருமன்) -> Varman (வர்மன்).

Notable individuals
 R. Verman, noted Art director
 Ravi Varman, Indian cinematographer, film director, and producer
 Sankara Varman, Indian astronomer-mathematician
 Kritavarma, also called Kritavarman or Kŗtavarmā

Rulers

India
 Arulmozhi Varman, Chola Emperor also known as Raja Raja Chola I who ruled over medieval Tamil Nadu
 Pallava dynasty kings of southern India:
 Simhavarman II
Simhavarman III
Mahendravarman I
Narasimhavarman I
 Mahendravarman II
 Paramesvaravarman I
 Narasimhavarman II
 Paramesvaravarman II
 Nandivarman II
 Dantivarman
 Nandivarman III
 Aparajitavarman
 Varman dynasty kings of eastern India:
 Pushyavarman, r.c. 350-374
 Samudravarman, r.c. 374-398
 Balavarman, r.c. 398-422
 Kalyanavarman, r.c. 422-446
 Ganapativarman, r.c. 446-470
 Mahendravarman, r.c. 470-494
 Narayanavarman, r.c. 494-518
 Bhutivarman, r.c. 518-542
 Chandramukhavarman, r.c. 542-566
 Sthitavarman, r.c. 566-590
 Susthitavarman, r.c. 590-595
 Supratisthitavarman, r.c. 595-600
 Bhaskaravarman, r.c. 600-650
 Avantivarman, r.c. 650-655
 Chera dynasty of southern India
 Kulashekhara Varman, founder of the second Chera empire in India
 Rajashekhara Varman, Chera ruler and saint of southern India
 Maipady Venkatesh Varma Raja : Raja of Kumbla
 Ravivarma Narasimha Domba Heggade :Raja of Vitla
 Kerala Varmans, a dynasty of Kerala, India

Outside India
 Mulavarman, king of Kutai Martadipura (present Indonesia)
 Purnawarman, king of Tarumanagara (present Indonesia)
 Adityawarman, king of Malayapura (present Indonesia)
 Samara Vijayatunggavarman, king of Srivijaya (present Indonesia, Singapore, and Malaysia)
Kings of Salakanagara (present Indonesia):
Dewawarman I
Dewawarman II
Dewawarman III
Dewawarman IV
Dewawarman V
Dewawarman VI
Dewawarman VII
Dewawarman VIII
Suryavarman I, king of Khmer Empire (present Cambodia)

References

Indian surnames
Nair
Vellalar